The 2002–03 Serie C1 was the twenty-fifth edition of Serie C1, the third highest league in the Italian football league system.

Serie C1/A

League table

Play-off

Semifinal

|-
| style="background:#eee" colspan=4 |
|-

Final

Play-out

|-
| style="background:#eee" colspan=4 |
|-

Verdict

Promoted in Serie B
 Treviso
 Albinoleffe
Relegated in Serie C2
 Arezzo
 Alzano Virescit and Carrarese 
Repechage to Serie C1 2003-2004
 Arezzo
Team Failed
 Alzano Virescit

Record 
Most wins: Treviso (19)
Fewer defeats: Albinoleffe (5)
Best attack: Albinoleffe (62 goals scored)
Best defense: Pisa (27 goals conceded)
Best goal difference: Albinoleffe (+26)
Most draw: Reggiana (18)
Fewer defeats: Calcio Treviso (8)
Most defeats: Arezzo (18)
Fewer wins: Albinoleffe (5)
Worst attack: Lucchese (28 goals scored)
Worst defense: Alzano Virescit (52 goals conceded)
Worst goal difference: Alzano Virescit (-19)
Bomber: Ciro Ginestra (21 goals, Padova)

Serie C1/B

League table

Play-off

Semifinal

|-
| style="background:#eee" colspan=4 |
|-

Final

Play-out

|-
| style="background:#eee" colspan=4 |
|-

Verdict
Promoted to Serie B
 Avellino
 Pescara 
Relegated to Serie C2
 Fermana
 Paternò and  Sora
Repechage to Serie C1 2003-2004
  Fermana, Paternò and Sora

Record 
Most wins: Avellino (21)
Fewer defeats: Pescara (5)
Best attack: Pescara (64 goals scored)
Best defense: Avellino (25 goals conceded)
Best goal difference: Pescara (+28)
Most draws: Vis Pesaro (15)
Fewer draws: Avellino (6)
Most defeats: L'Aquila and Paternò (17)
Fewer wins: Fermana and Vis Pesaro (7)
Worst attack: Benevento (27 goals scored)
Worst defense: L'Aquila (53 goals conceded)
Worst goal difference: L'Aquila (-23)
Bomber: Simone Motta (23 goals, Teramo)

External links
Italy 2002/03 at RSSSF

Serie C1 seasons
Italy
3